Skot (symbol: sk) is an old and deprecated measurement unit of luminance, used for self-luminous objects (dark luminance). The term comes from Greek skotos, meaning "darkness".

Overview
Conversion factors for so called "scotopic stilb" depend on the spectral distribution of the light and were therefore defined in 1948 by the International Commission on Illumination (IBK) for a specific color temperature of 2042 K or 2046 K (before 1948 of 2360 K, as emitted by a wolfram-vacuum lamp). At this temperature, the temperature of solidification of platinum, 1 sk = 10−3 asb. The maximum allowed value is 10 skot to avoid the unit being used up into areas of mixed scotopic and photopic vision of the eye.

Unit conversions

See also
 Nox (unit) to measure the dark illuminance
 Purkinje effect
 Photometry (optics)
 Scotopic lux
 Scotopic vision

References

Units of luminance
Centimetre–gram–second system of units